Girault is a surname, and may refer to:

In people:
 Alexandre Arsène Girault (1884–1941), American entomologist. Arsène Napoleon Girault's great-grandson.
 Charles Girault (1851–1932), French architect
 Hubert Girault (b. 1957), Swiss electrochemist
 Joseph-Philibert Girault de Prangey (1804–1892), French photographer and draughtsman
 Olivier Girault (b. 1973), French handball player
 Ron Girault (b. 1986), American football safety
 Vivette Girault (b. 1943), French mathematician

In botany:
 Rosa 'Alexandre Girault', a rose cultivar originating from Orléans, France and developed in 1907 by Barbier Frères & Compagnie. It is not named after the American entomologist. See List of rose cultivars named after people.

French-language surnames